Patrick McDonough (born July 22, 1961) is a retired track cyclist from the United States. He represented his native country of the United States at the 1984 Summer Olympics in Los Angeles, California, where he won the silver medal in the men's 4.000m team pursuit, alongside Steve Hegg, Leonard Nitz, David Grylls and Brent Emery.

In recent years McDonough has helped run the Olympic Training Center Velodrome and the Boulder Valley Velodrome.

References

External links
 databaseOlympics

1961 births
Living people
American track cyclists
American male cyclists
Cyclists at the 1984 Summer Olympics
Olympic silver medalists for the United States in cycling
Place of birth missing (living people)
Medalists at the 1984 Summer Olympics